Ricardo Díez-Hochleitner is the name of:

Ricardo Díez Hochleitner (professor) (1928–2020), Spanish-born professor, father.
Ricardo Díez-Hochleitner Rodríguez (ambassador) (born 1953), Spanish diplomat, son.